Enoch "Tubby" Hood (10 January 1861 – 2 February 1940) was a founder member of Port Vale F.C. (1876) and was the first recorded team captain (1879). His brothers Jack and Harry, and nephew Edgar also played for Port Vale.

Football career
Hood played for Porthill Victoria before becoming a founder member of Port Vale F.C., probably in 1879. The decision to found a new team was based on the fact that Porthill was inconveniently far away from Hood and a number of other players wished to play closer to home. He was the captain of the first recorded Vale line-up on 9 December 1882, also scoring the goal of the 5–1 defeat to nearby Stoke. He scored in the replayed final of the North Staffordshire Charity Challenge Cup in 1883, which Vale won 4–2. Between November 1884 and April 1885 he played only the occasional match and from that point onwards was mainly a reserve and supporter.

Other work
He worked as a potter for much of his life.

Hood was a lay preacher and member of the Burslem Brotherhood (a Christian social group). He was a highly respected member of the community and his granddaughter, Edna Lamb, had many recollections of his work for charity, including collecting funds to kit out the local brass band for Christmas performances.

Career statistics
Source:

References

Kent, Jeff. (1991) Port Vale Tales, Witan Books.

1861 births
1940 deaths
Footballers from Stoke-on-Trent
English Christians
English footballers
Association football wingers
Port Vale F.C. players